The Ironclad gas field is a natural gas field located offshore the Cabo Delgado Province. It was discovered in 2012 and developed by Anadarko Petroleum. It began production in 2012 and produces natural gas and condensates. The total proven reserves of the Ironclad gas field are around 5 trillion cubic feet (143 km³), and production is slated to be around 50 million cubic feet/day (1.9×105m³).

References

Natural gas fields in Mozambique